Nokuku  (Nogugu) is an Oceanic language spoken in the north of Espiritu Santo Island in Vanuatu.

References

Espiritu Santo languages
Languages of Vanuatu